Yorkshire Day is a yearly celebration on 1 August to promote the historic county of Yorkshire, England. It was celebrated by the Yorkshire Ridings Society in 1975, initially in Beverley, as "a protest movement against the local government re-organisation of 1974".

On 1 August the Slavery Abolition Act 1833 was passed, during the British Empire in 1834. William Wilberforce, a Yorkshire MP, had campaigned for the emancipation.

The day was already celebrated by the Light Infantry, successors to the King's Own Yorkshire Light Infantry, as Minden Day, after the battle of Minden. Together with five other infantry regiments of the British Army, a rose is permitted to be worn in the headdress. In the case of the Light Infantry, the rose is white.

Yorkshire Society
Amongst the celebrations there is a civic gathering of lord mayors, mayors, and other civic heads from across the county, convened by the Yorkshire Society, on 1 August each year which has been held in:

1985: York
1986: Ripon
1987: Wakefield
1988: Wakefield
1989: Whitby
1990: Skipton
1991: Rotherham
1992: Richmond
1993: Leeds
1994: Doncaster
1995: Barnsley
1996: Todmorden
1997: Bradford
1998: Huddersfield
1999: Kingston upon Hull
2000: York
2001: Wakefield
2003: Halifax
2004: Leeds
2005: Bradford
2006: Penistone
2007: Kingston upon Hull
2008: Redcar
2009: Malton
2010: Hedon
2011: Wakefield
2012: Scarborough
2013: Skipton
2014: South Kirkby and Moorthorpe
2015: Doncaster
2016: Halifax
2017: Sheffield
2018: Ripon
2019: Whitby
2022: Keighley

Saltburn, Guisborough and Saddleworth have also played host. Celebrations were cancelled in 2020 and 2021 due to COVID-19 restrictions.

Similar events have been promoted by the Friends of Real Lancashire (27 November, since 1996) and the Huntingdonshire Society (25 April, since 2002) to promote their counties.

On Yorkshire Day, members of the society read a "Declaration of Integrity":
"I, [Name], being a resident of the [West/North/East] Riding of Yorkshire [or City of York] declare:

These declarations made this Yorkshire Day [Year]. God Save the King!"
In York the Declaration is made four times by the Yorkshire Ridings Society, once for each Riding and once for the City of York. The traditional boundaries of the Three Ridings run up to the ancient city walls, so by processing out of three of the bars (gatehouses) the Society can make the Declaration in each Riding, followed by reading the Declaration within a fourth bar inside the City.

Critical reaction
The day has attracted some criticism:

In its early years, the day was not widely acknowledged. A 1991 Times editorial read:

See also
 St Piran's Day
 Sussex Day

Notes

References

External links

Yorkshire culture
August observances
Events in Yorkshire
Annual events in England